Mulvane is a city in Sedgwick and Sumner counties in the U.S. state of Kansas.  As of the 2020 census, the population of the city was 6,286.

History

Mulvane was laid out in 1879 at the junction of five Santa Fe rail lines.  It is named for Joab R. Mulvane, a railroad official who was instrumental in bringing the Atchison, Topeka, and Santa Fe Railroad to Mulvane.

Geography
Mulvane is located at  (37.479746, -97.242309).

Mulvane's Main Street follows part of the Sedgwick and Sumner county lines, and the town center is about five miles west of the spot where Sedgwick, Sumner, Butler and Cowley counties meet.

Demographics

Mulvane is a part of the Wichita, KS Metropolitan Statistical Area.

2010 census
As of the census of 2010, there were 6,111 people, 2,244 households, and 1,661 families living in the city. The racial makeup of the city was 94.4% White, 0.6% African American, 1.1% Native American, 0.8% Asian, 0.1% Pacific Islander, 0.7% from other races, and 2.4% from two or more races. Hispanic or Latino of any race were 3.5% of the population.

There were 2,244 households, of which 40.4% had children under the age of 18 living with them, 59.3% were married couples living together, 10.5% had a female householder with no husband present, 4.2% had a male householder with no wife present, and 26.0% were non-families. 23.4% of all households were made up of individuals, and 10.5% had someone living alone who was 65 years of age or older. The average household size was 2.70 and the average family size was 3.18.

The median age in the city was 35.1 years. 30.4% of residents were under the age of 18; 6.9% were between the ages of 18 and 24; 25.5% were from 25 to 44; 24.2% were from 45 to 64; and 13.1% were 65 years of age or older. The gender makeup of the city was 48.0% male and 52.0% female.

2000 census
As of the census of 2000, there were 5,155 people, 1,896 households, and 1,444 families living in the city. The racial makeup of the city was 96.39% White, 0.17% African American, 0.99% Native American, 0.29% Asian, 0.06% Pacific Islander, 0.60% from other races, and 1.49% from two or more races. Hispanic or Latino of any race were 2.58% of the population.

There were 1,896 households, of which 41.0% had children under the age of 18 living with them, 63.0% were married couples living together, 9.3% had a female householder with no husband present, and 23.8% were non-families. 21.0% of all households were made up of individuals, and 9.1% had someone living alone who was 65 years of age or older. The average household size was 2.69 and the average family size was 3.14.

In the city, the population was spread out, with 30.4% under the age of 18, 8.4% from 18 to 24, 28.8% from 25 to 44, 20.7% from 45 to 64, and 11.7% were 65 years of age or older. The median age was 34 years. For every 100 females, there were 93.1 males. For every 100 females age 18 and over, there were 89.8 males.

The median income for a household in the city was $46,923, and the median income for a family was $56,285. Males had a median income of $39,732 versus $26,797 for females. The per capita income for the city was $19,523. About 2.1% of families and 3.4% of the population were below the poverty line, including 4.0% of those under age 18 and 1.6% of those age 65 or over.

Area events and attractions
 Mulvane Old Settlers - one of the longest-running community events in Kansas, having started in 1873 (ten years before the town was officially incorporated).
 Kansas Star Casino
 Doc Sunback Film Festival - annual film festival held in Mulvane, with a focus on independent films and filmmakers from Kansas.
 The Lumberyard - an independently owned venue that hosts free shows, from both local and touring bands; operated by members of local bands Peters 1914 and Jackass.

Education

Primary and secondary
The community is served by Mulvane USD 263 public school district. Munson Primary School teaches grades pre-kindergarten through 2nd grade, Mulvane Grade School teaches 3rd grade-5th grade while Mulvane Middle School teaches 6th through 8th, and Mulvane High School teaches 9th though 12th.

Colleges and universities
Cowley County Community College operates a satellite campus within city limits.

Notable people

 Laura Cobb, United States Navy nurse during World War II
 Dennis Franchione, college football coach.

References

Further reading

External links

 City of Mulvane
 Mulvane - Directory of Public Officials
 Mulvane city map, KDOT

Cities in Kansas
Cities in Sedgwick County, Kansas
Cities in Sumner County, Kansas
Wichita, KS Metropolitan Statistical Area
Kansas populated places on the Arkansas River
Populated places established in 1879
1879 establishments in Kansas